Claraeola halterata is a species of fly in the family Pipunculidae.

Distribution
Austria, Belgium, Great Britain, Germany, Latvia, Netherlands.

References

Pipunculidae
Insects described in 1838
Diptera of Europe
Taxa named by Johann Wilhelm Meigen